Andrés de Ubilla, O.P. (1540 – May 1603) was a Roman Catholic prelate who served as Bishop of Michoacán (1603) and Bishop of Chiapas (1592–1603).

Biography
Andrés de Ubilla was born in Eibar, Spain in 1540 and ordained a priest in the Order of Preachers on 22 July 1558. In 1587 Andrés was accused of inappropriate behavior by Diego Durán. On 21 May 1592, he was appointed during the papacy of Pope Clement VIII as Bishop of Chiapas.
On 29 January 1603, he was appointed during the papacy of Pope Clement VIII as Bishop of Michoacán.
He served as Bishop of Michoacán until his death in May 1603.

References

External links and additional sources
 (for Chronology of Bishops) 
 (for Chronology of Bishops)  
 (for Chronology of Bishops) 
 (for Chronology of Bishops) 

17th-century Roman Catholic bishops in Mexico
Bishops appointed by Pope Clement VIII
1540 births
1603 deaths
Dominican bishops